Johan Rousseau (born 8 October 1978) is a French luger and speed skier.

Career
In April 1997, he became junior world recordman in speed skiing with a 228.426 km/h speed in Les Arcs (France). He got his best performance in 2005 in Les Arcs with a 245.065 km/h speed.

He competed in the men's singles event at the 2002 Winter Olympics where he finished 15th.

References

External links
 

1978 births
Living people
French male lugers
Olympic lugers of France
Lugers at the 2002 Winter Olympics
Sportspeople from Uppsala